FST may refer to:

Arts and entertainment 
 Finlands Svenska Television, now Yle Fem, the Swedish-language department of the Finnish Broadcasting Company
 Florida Studio Theatre, in Sarasota, Florida, United States
 Free Southern Theater, in Mississippi, United States

Government and politics 
 Fermanagh and South Tyrone (Assembly constituency), in Northern Ireland
 Fermanagh and South Tyrone (UK Parliament constituency), in Northern Ireland
 Financial Secretary to the Treasury in the United Kingdom

Military 
 Fire Support Team of the Royal Artillery
 Fleet Survey Team of the United States Navy
 Forward surgical teams of the United States Army

Technology 
Food Science and Technology
 Feature Selection Toolbox, machine learning software
 File Streaming Technology, a digital audio format
 Finite-state transducer

Transport 
 Fenchurch Street railway station, in London
 First Stop Travel, a Scottish bus operator
 Fort Stockton–Pecos County Airport, in Texas, United States
 Sint-Truiden railway station, in Belgium

Other uses 
 Family Survival Trust, in the United Kingdom
 Field sobriety test
 Fiji Standard Time
 Fixation index (FST)
 Follistatin
 Foreign Sports Talent Scheme, in Singapore
 Foundation for Science and Technology, in the United Kingdom
 Franciscan School of Theology, in California, United States
 French School of Thessaloniki, in Greece
 Full-Scale Tunnel, a demolished NASA wind tunnel